Highpoint Shopping Centre is a super regional shopping centre located in Maribyrnong, Victoria, in the western suburbs of Melbourne, Victoria.

Highpoint is Victoria's third largest shopping centre and the fifth largest in Australia, with an annual turnover of $778 million and over 15 million shoppers visiting each year. It is the largest shopping centre serving Melbourne's western and north western suburbs, an area with a population of at least half a million people.

History 
Highpoint is built on a hill which looks out over the Maribyrnong River to Melbourne's CBD, hence its name. An anti-aircraft battery operated on the site during World War II for protection of the surrounding military bases and ammunition works in Maidstone and Maribyrnong.

The 50-acre site was previously a quarry, as can be seen by the quarry cliff face walls of the lower carparks. The land was sold by the City of Essendon for $1.85 million in April 1971, with permission required also from the City of Sunshine as the quarry was also located in that local government area.

Highpoint West opened in September 1975. Built by Development Underwriting Ltd. for $12,000,000.

Named originally "Westland" to fit in with other shopping centres, Northland, etc., it opened as "Highpoint West". It was later renamed "Highpoint City", and then just  "Highpoint".

Redevelopment

2011 - 2013
The most recent rounds of expansion and redevelopment occurred in two stages, commencing in March 2011. An additional 30,000 m² was added including the first David Jones department store in Melbourne's western suburbs. Expansions, over two levels, incorporated traffic flow improvements, an additional 1,000 car spaces and 100 extra speciality retailers. The first stage of the redevelopment opened 18 October 2012 included a new Woolworths as well as a Fresh Food Market, and an improved car park with "Park Assist" technology. The second stage opened on 14 March 2013 including the David Jones store over two levels, an Apple Store, Australia's 2nd Samsung Experience store, a Topshop clothing store (now closed and replaced by Uniqlo) and a Zara clothing store along with 98 specialty stores and an extra 1,000 car spaces. One of the redevelopments aims was to improve the centre's sustainability.

Highpoint Urban Village plan
In 2021, GPT approved the Highpoint Urban Village plan, a development plan for an urban village composed of a mixture of residential and commercial uses, community facilities, green open spaces and provision for additional retail. The 30-year plan includes proposals for a new  library and community hub, new green space including a new town plaza, around 3,000 new dwellings, bus interchange upgrades and the construction of commercial and retail spaces.

Ownership 
Until 2006, Highpoint was wholly owned by Melbourne's Besen family (also owners of the Sussan retail chain). In March 2006, the GPT (General Property Trust) Group purchased a 50% stake and management rights in the centre for about A$621.2 million.
In September 2017, GPT bought the remaining 50% of Highpoint for $680 million. The Highpoint complex was independently valued at $2.3 billion in late 2016.

References

External links 

accessibility.com.au - Highpoint Shopping Centre Disability information resource reports on accessibility of this shopping centre for users of wheelchairs or baby strollers.
Australian Steel Institute Steel Design Awards - 2006 - Highpoint Shopping Centre - Southern Extension Discusses how steel trusses were used for a complex dome structure in this building extension. This was the winner in the "small project" category.

Shopping centres in Melbourne
Shopping malls established in 1975
Maribyrnong, Victoria
Buildings and structures in the City of Maribyrnong
1975 establishments in Australia